Medrylamine is an antihistamine related to diphenhydramine.

References

Dimethylamino compounds
Ethers
H1 receptor antagonists
Muscarinic antagonists
Muscle relaxants